The 847 Damascus earthquake occurred (probably on 24 November) in AD 847. Recent scholarship suggests that the earthquake was part of a multiple earthquake stretching from Damascus to the south, to Antioch in the north and to Mosul in the east. There were an estimated 20,000 casualties in Antioch according to the 13th-century historian and writer Al-Dhahabi, and 50,000 in Mosul. It is thought to be one of the most powerful earthquakes along the Dead Sea Transform.

Tectonic setting
The northern Levant lies across the Dead Sea Transform (DST), the mainly strike-slip boundary between the Arabian Plate and the African Plate. In Lebanon the DST has a SW-NE trend that has caused transpression and the formation of the Mount Lebanon range and the Anti-Lebanon range. The main fault strand is the Yammouneh Fault, which has been the location of several major earthquakes, such as the 1202 Syria earthquake and the Near East earthquakes of 1759. The 847 earthquake has also been linked to movement on this fault.

Other earthquakes in 847 A.D.
A number of other towns and cities in the Middle East also suffered major destruction in 847 A.D., probably on the same day (24 November). The earthquake in Antioch may have been the same one which  destroyed much of Damascus, Syria on 24 November 847. The Damascus earthquake began around dawn, lasting until at least midday; part of the Umayyad (Great) Mosque was destroyed and its minaret fell down. Bridges and houses collapsed, and huge stones were displaced. Other towns near Damascus were destroyed including Darayya.

There was destruction in towns in Homs (Syria), in Lebanon, and also in the region of the Jazira (Upper Mesopotamia). There was also a large earthquake in Mosul (now in Iraq), in which up to 50,000 people were killed.

See also
List of earthquakes in the Levant
List of earthquakes in Turkey
List of historical earthquakes

References

0847 Damascus
Medieval Antioch
Medieval Damascus
History of Mosul
847
9th-century earthquakes
847 Damascus earthquake
Earthquakes in Syria
847 Damascus earthquake